A mountain hut is a building located high in the mountains, generally accessible only by foot, intended to provide food and shelter to mountaineers, climbers and hikers. Mountain huts are usually operated by an Alpine Club or some organization dedicated to hiking or mountain recreation. They are known by many names, including alpine hut, mountain shelter, mountain refuge, mountain lodge, and mountain hostel. It may also be called a refuge hut, although these occur in lowland areas (e.g. lowland forests) too.

Mountain huts can provide a range of services, starting with shelter and simple sleeping berths. Some, particularly in remote areas, are not staffed, but others have staff which prepare meals and drinks and can provide other services, including providing lectures and selling clothing and small items.  Mountain huts usually allow anybody to access their facilities, although some require reservations.

While shelters have long existed in mountains, modern hut systems date back a century and a half. The Swiss Alpine Club has built huts since 1863. In the United States, the Appalachian Mountain Club built its first hut at Madison Spring in New Hampshire in 1889.

Huts

The Alps
The construction of refuges and shelters in the Alps date back to ancient times, when Roman roads led across the mountain passes. In the High Middle Ages, hospitales were erected along the trade routes; cottages and sheds on the high mountain pastures served for Alpine transhumance. The long history of mountaineering from the 19th century onwards has led to a large number of Alpine club huts as well as private huts along the mountaineering paths. These huts are categorised according to their location and facilities. They may have beds or a mattress room (Matratzenlager) for overnight stays.

Just as the Margherita Hut in the Valais Alps is the highest alpine refuge at 4,554 m, the Rifugio Mario Premuda in Trieste owned by the Italian Alpine Association is the lowest refuge in the Alps at 82 m.

Britain
In the United Kingdom the tradition is of unwardened "climbing huts" providing fairly rudimentary accommodation (but superior to that of a bothy) close to a climbing ground; the huts are usually conversions (e.g. of former quarrymen's cottages, or of disused mine buildings), and are not open to passers-by except in emergency. Many climbing clubs in the UK have such huts in Snowdonia or in the Lake District. A well-known example is the Charles Inglis Clark Memorial Hut (the 'CIC Hut') - a purpose-built hut below the northern crags of Ben Nevis in Scotland.
In the past, some shelters in Scotland were built in exposed locations at high elevation, often as part of military training exercises. However, and particularly following the 1971 Cairngorm Plateau Disaster, these were deliberately demolished because they were thought to pose dangers exceeding their benefits.

Norway
The Norwegian Trekking Association operates about 460 cabins mostly in the mountains and in forested areas, of which about 400 have lodgings. Many cabins are unstaffed and open all year, while the staffed cabins often are just open during summer.

Poland
In Poland most mountain shelters and huts are run by the Polish Tourist and Sightseeing Society, with some being privately owned. In the Polish mountains, there are about 100 shelters. Most mountain shelters offer multi-person rooms and refreshments. Polish mountain huts are obliged by their own regulations to allow overnight anyone who is not able to find any other place before sunset, but conditions may be spartan (e.g. a mattress in a hall or warm basement).

Slovakia
In Slovakia there is a dense network of mountain huts ("chata") in most mountain and forest regions, serving a culture of hiking. In the past they were managed by the official tourist union, but now are mostly in private hands. Official mountain huts are similar to guest houses and are run by full-time managers. In winter, some refuges are closed.

United States
There are many huts in the United States, for example in the Rocky Mountains, the Appalachian Mountains and other ranges. The High Huts of the White Mountains in New Hampshire are generally "full service" (cooks serve food) through summer and early fall, while some are open the rest of the year as self-service huts, at which hikers bring and prepare their own food.

Canada
The Alpine Club of Canada operates what it calls the "largest network of backcountry huts in North America."

New Zealand 
The New Zealand Department of Conservation "manages a network of over 950 huts of all shapes and sizes."

The Himalayas
The mountains of Asia do not have a well-developed system of public mountain huts, although hiking, trekking and mountain climbing are common. In 2015, a competition was launched to design huts that could be located along trekking trails of Nepal.

South Africa 
Many places in Africa have hiking huts but they are usually privately owned and require payment and reservations. At least one hut is open for public use on Table Mountain in South Africa, part of Table Mountain National Park.

Gallery

Europe

Latin America

North America

Africa

Oceania, Australia, New Zealand

See also

 Adirondack lean-to
 bothy
 Lean-to
 Log cabin - small house built from logs
 Vernacular architecture - traditional architecture in a particular area
 Wilderness hut - rent-free, open dwelling place for temporary accommodation

References

External links
 Informative website about European mountain huts